Over–under is a bet. 

Over–under may also refer to:

 Over/under cable coiling
 A grappling position called over–under position 
 An over and under shotgun
 Over and Under, an album by folk musician Greg Brown
 Over and under are the possible alternatives for toilet paper orientation
 Over/Under is a series by the music publication website, Pitchfork